Andreas Ivan (born 10 January 1995) is a Romanian professional footballer who plays as an attacking midfielder or winger for the German club  Schalke 04 II.
Ivan spent the first part of his senior career in the lower leagues of Germany, representing Stuttgarter Kickers, Rot-Weiss Essen, Wuppertaler SV and SV Waldhof Mannheim respectively. In the summer of 2018, aged 23, he signed for New York Red Bulls in the Major League Soccer.

Club career

Early years
A native of Pitești, Romania, Ivan began his career in the youth ranks of German clubs VfB Stuttgart and Karlsruher SC, before moving to Stuttgarter Kickers where signed his first professional contract on 1 January 2014. He made his professional debut on 9 February that year, appearing as a starter in a 1–0 victory over VfB Stuttgart II.

At the start of 2016, he joined regional league team Rot-Weiss Essen, where he won the Lower Rhine Cup 3–0 against Wuppertaler SV on 28 May. In the 2017 winter break, Ivan moved to league rivals Wuppertaler SV. Ivan scored his first two goals for the club on 25 February 2017, in a 4–1 victory over Rot Weiss Ahlen.

In the summer of 2017, Ivan signed a one-year contract with SV Waldhof Mannheim. On 4 September 2017, Ivan netted his first goal for "the Waldhof Boys" in a 2–0 victory over FSV Frankfurt. In his sole season at the club, Ivan made 31 appearances and scored eight goals.

New York Red Bulls

On 8 July 2018, it was reported that Ivan had rejected a trial with Hamburger SV and would be joining Major League Soccer team New York Red Bulls. On 20 July, the signing was officially announced by the American side. He made his debut by appearing as a second-half substitute in a 1–0 victory over Chicago Fire, on 11 August. 

He scored his first competitive goal for the Red Bulls on 27 February 2019, helping to a 3–0 victory over Dominican club Atlético Pantoja in the CONCACAF Champions League's round of 16. Three days later, he also recorded his first MLS goal after opening the scoring with a header in an eventual 1–1 draw with Columbus Crew.

On 14 August 2019, Ivan was waived by New York.

Further career
On 30 January 2020, Ivan returned to Germany, joining Regionalliga Südwest club VfR Aalen on a contract until the end of the season. He appeared in two league games for the club and was released at the end of the season after his contract expired.

Ivan signed a two-year contract with fellow Regionalliga Südwest club Sonnenhof Großaspach in August 2020. He agreed the termination of his contract on 31 August 2021, the last day of the 2021 summer transfer window. He then moved to Rot Weiss Ahlen.

Schalke 04
On 27 July 2022, Ivan agreed to join Schalke 04, where he was initially assigned to the reserve team. He made his Bundesliga debut for the first team of Schalke on 24 January 2023, coming on as a substitute in the 46th minute in a 6–1 home defeat against RB Leipzig.

International career
Born in Romania, Ivan represented Germany at under-19 level, earning a cap on 5 March 2014 in a 1–1 draw with Italy. In 2015, he was convoked by his native country for the under-21 team.

Career statistics

Club

Honours
Rot-Weiss Essen
Lower Rhine Cup: 2016

New York Red Bulls
Supporters' Shield: 2018

References

External links

1995 births
Living people
Sportspeople from Pitești
Romanian emigrants to Germany
Romanian footballers
Association football wingers
3. Liga players
Regionalliga players
Bundesliga players
Stuttgarter Kickers players
Rot-Weiss Essen players
Wuppertaler SV players
SV Waldhof Mannheim players
VfR Aalen players
SG Sonnenhof Großaspach players
Major League Soccer players
USL Championship players
New York Red Bulls players
New York Red Bulls II players
FC Schalke 04 II players
FC Schalke 04 players
Germany youth international footballers
Romania under-21 international footballers
Romanian expatriate footballers
Expatriate footballers in Germany
Romanian expatriate sportspeople in Germany
Expatriate soccer players in the United States
Romanian expatriate sportspeople in the United States